Polystachya geniculata is a species of flowering plant in the orchid family, Orchidaceae. It is endemic to Cameroon.  It is known from only two locations. It grows in the soil or on rocks.

References

geniculata
Endemic orchids of Cameroon
Endangered plants
Taxonomy articles created by Polbot